Frænkel Land is a peninsula in King Christian X Land, East Greenland. Administratively it is part of the Northeast Greenland National Park.

History 
It was named Frænkels Halfö by A.G. Nathorst on his 1899 expedition after Knut Frænkel, the Swedish engineer and meteorologist on Andrée's balloon expedition to the North Pole. Nathorst's expedition was searching for traces of the lost Andrée expedition.

Petermann Peak was named by the Second German North Polar Expedition 1869–70 as Petermanns Spitze in honour of the initiator of the expedition, August Heinrich Petermann.

Geography
Frænkel Land is bounded by the inner reaches of Kaiser Franz Joseph Fjord in the south, with the Nordenskiöld Glacier (Akuliarutsip Sermerssua) in the southwest, the Gregory Glacier and the Magog Nunatak in the west, the Jætte Glacier in the north and northwest, and the Isfjord in the northeast.

Louise Boyd Land is located to the northwest.

References

Peninsulas of Greenland